Kallang Wave Mall is a shopping mall in Kallang, Singapore.

Background
Opened on 27 June 2014, Kallang Wave Mall is part of the Singapore Sports Hub and is integrated into the National Stadium.

The mall is named as a reference to the Kallang Wave, a wave cheer similar to the Mexican wave that was commonly seen in the former National Stadium that the Singapore Sports Hub replaces.

Situated at the doorstep of Kallang Wave Mall is Stadium MRT station along the Circle line.

References

2014 establishments in Singapore
Kallang
Shopping malls in Singapore